Henry Bird may refer to:

 Henry Bird (chess player) (1830–1908), English chess player and chess writer
 Henry Bird (cricketer) (1800–1864), English professional cricketer
 Henry Bird (artist) (1909–2000), British artist
 Henry Real Bird (born 1948), Native Crow Indian

See also
 Henry Bird Steinhauer (1804–1885), Native Ojibwe Indian and Methodist missionary
 Henry Byrd (1918–1980), American singer and pianist
 Henry Byrde, 2nd Commander of the Ceylon Volunteers